Teen Big Brother may refer to:

 Teen Big Brother: The Experiment
 Pinoy Big Brother: Teen Edition